Henry F. Chan is an American film and television director.  He has directed over 200 episodes of television for all major U.S. networks.  In 2013, he directed his first Chinese language film, 100 Days (真愛100天) in Taiwan.

Career
At the beginning of his career, Chan won a Primetime Emmy Award for editing The Cosby Show in 1986, he was also nominated again the following year. He made his directorial debut, directing A Different World.

Chan has since directed episodes of The Ms. Pat Show, Bigger, The Comedy Get Down, Cooper Barrett's Guide to Surviving Life, Fresh Off the Boat, Zoe Ever After, A to Z, Growing Up Fisher, The Neighbors, Whitney, Don't Trust the B---- in Apartment 23, 10 Things I Hate About You, Let's Stay Together, Kitchen Confidential, Living Single, Moesha, The Parkers, Girlfriends, The King of Queens, Scrubs, Lizzie McGuire and a few other series.

Henry's Chinese comedy series "Rich House, Poor House" 王子富愁记，aired on Youku in January 2018.  In 2003, Henry directed his first film Gas'' starring Flex Alexander and Khalil Kain.

References

External links

Henry Chan profile at AlivenotDead.com
Henry Chan on Vimeo

American film directors
American film directors of Chinese descent
American television directors
Primetime Emmy Award winners
Living people
Place of birth missing (living people)
Year of birth missing (living people)